Etty Hillesum and the Flow of Presence: A Voegelinian Analysis   is a 2008 book by Dutch philosopher Meins G. S. Coetsier,  According to WorldCat, the book is held in 781  libraries.

Meins G. S. Coetsier
The author,  Dr. Meins G. S. Coetsier,  is staff member, film director and webmaster of the Etty Hillesum Research Centre. He obtained his B.A. in philosophy in 2004 and was awarded Master of Arts in Philosophy, at The Milltown Institute of Theology and Philosophy in Dublin, Ireland in 2006. In 2008, he was awarded Doctor of Philosophy at Ghent University ( Department of Philosophy and moral sciences) with a study on Eric Voegelin. Coetsier is director of the Centre of Eric Voegelin Studies (EVS) at Ugent and is founder of the Flow of Presence Academy (FPA).

Eric Voegelin
Coetsier's reflections on the German philosopher and political scientist Eric Voegelin entered his philosophical journey during his stay in Ireland. Voegelin's philosophy of experience and symbolization touched Coetsier's search for meaning. He was struck by Voegelin's rearticulation of the experience of the In-Between (Plato: metaxy), the central locus for the recapture of reality historically lost to consciousness. The existential authenticity of the language symbols that Voegelin uses challenged Coetsier to write a book on the flow of presence. Meditating on Voegelin's philosophical symbols helped him to realize that the experience of such attunement to the flow of presence is the key to being human.

Etty Hillesum
During his stay in Dublin, Coetsier studied the works of Etty Hillesum, a young Dutch woman. Considering his own Dutch nationality and the historical background and sufferings of some of his family members during World War II, he has tried to make his philosophical approach to her work as “real” as possible. Coetsier visited Etty's family home in Deventer, Amsterdam, where she studied; Camp Westerbork in the Netherlands, where she was detained; and Auschwitz in Poland, where she was imprisoned and murdered. In the light of his research journeys and of those visits to Auschwitz and Westerbork and as a result of having had the privilege of reading and studying the original diaries of Etty Hillesum in the Dutch language in the Joods Historisch Museum of Amsterdam, he has gradually become aware of how Etty Hillesum brought “mind” and “heart” together in a personal attunement to the flow of presence.

Contents
 Acknowledgments
 Abbreviations
 INTRODUCTION___ Spiritual Filter
 ONE Etty Hillesum
 TWO The Letters and Diaries
 THREE__ Eric Voegelin
 FOUR___ Etty Hillesum in the Flow of Presence
 CONCLUSION
 Bibliography
 Index

Vision
Etty Hillesum and the Flow of Presence: A Voegelinian Analysis revisits the core of valuable materials of two major thinkers of the twentieth century, Eric Voegelin and Etty Hillesum. It contributes to a new understanding of familiar material by treating it in an original and thought-provoking manner. This study blends the thought and life experiences of two mystical thinkers in one overall vision for the twenty-first century. Prof. Dr. Macon Boczek writes: "Coetsier devotes the opening chapter to Etty Hillesum’s life. He follows this with a chapter on her letters and diaries. He then devotes a further chapter to the thought of Eric Voegelin and in the final chapter, shows the remarkable coincidence of her spiritual experiences with Voegelin’s own." The major contribution of Voegelin's notion "the flow of presence" is that it makes the inner development of Hillesum's mystically grounded resistance to Nazism transparent. The theory of Voegelin's analytic of experience and symbolization is brought to life in relation to Hillesum's work. The book thereby confirms the hermeneutical value of such an approach as well as retrieving one of the lesser known heroes of the Holocaust. The Voegelin material is well expressed and the argument is tight as, for example, in Chapter 4 where Hillesum's scattered meditations are comprehended within a number of the categories Voegelin has made available.

An interesting sentence from Meins Coetsier’s book on Etty Hillesum. He comments on the fact that her writing and silent meditation helped her to “tap into an area within herself that in society had mainly vanished.” Voegelin believed that the disappearance of meditation as a ‘cultural factor’ resulted in the practical ignorance of those aspects of reality touched on by myth, philosophy and mysticism. In other words the secularisation of society has deprived people, or most people perhaps, of an awareness of the depth of reality, of the spiritual dimension. He goes on to talk about a ‘perverse closure of consciousness against reality’ (p. 129). I wonder about the ‘perverse’. For some, perhaps, yes. They make a conscious decision to ignore any spiritual promptings. But for many, I think, socialisation into a secular and materialist culture has simply obscured any such awareness. The occasions when they might perhaps suspect that there is more to reality than the material surface of things are when they encounter a limit situation. Though it is also the case, as David Hay found in his Nottingham survey, that many people feel that there is ‘something there’, that there is more to reality than surface appearances. But ‘a feeling’ is about as far as it goes. This is not something people generally feel they can talk about with others. Spirituality, religion, mysticism are all taboo subjects. We all have capax dei and in some exceptional people, like Etty Hillesum, awareness of it develops in spite, or maybe because of external circumstances. But in most of us it needs to be nurtured and guided. 

Eric Voegelin and Etty Hillesum could help us to 'nurture and guide,' they contribute to our understanding of cathartic resistance to totalitarian crisis, and to the spiritual truth emergent within such existence. Hillesum's search as presented in this book fits well within themes integral to the Voegelin literature.

Scholarly contribution
Etty Hillesum and the Flow of Presence: A Voegelinian Analysis is the thorough reading of the symbol world of Hillesum's interior journey. She was a remarkable witness both in terms of the substance of her work and of her literary formulation. Professor Boczek writes: "Etty Hillesum, as a young woman in Amsterdam, had been a secular, non-observant Jew from a troubled yet creative family. She entered adulthood in a state of psychological distress and was caught up in the twentieth century sexual revolution. Yet she was driven by a search for meaning in life. The people and events in her life, plus her rich educational and linguistic background, brought her to the “discovery of an existential interior openness to the divine.” “Here is a personal odyssey,” Coetsier writes, “a spiritual turnaround, an emotional healing, an emergence of representative consciousness, that is eminently worthy of study.” (p. 6)". Under extraordinary conditions Hillesum underwent the growth of the soul that enabled her to triumph over the totalitarian nightmare. Thereby, she found the linguistic means of making this development available to succeeding generations. To follow it however we must be prepared to take the full measure of the rich symbol world she developed for the task. This book, with its access to the Dutch sources and the dissection of the linguistic universe of Etty Hillesum, contributes both to Hillesum research and Voegelinian scholarship. Professor Boczek argues:Coetsier is able to employ Voegelin’s thought to analyze Hillesum for two reasons:  first because Voegelin carried out extensive diagnoses of the spiritual disorder that grounds modernity as well as an exhaustive exegesis of the divine/human encounter as constitutive of human nature. And second, “the rich philosophical and religious symbolisms” in Hillesum’s less technical and more poetic Letters and Diaries make them an excellent source that both illustrates and substantiates Voegelin’s work as revealed in the “Drama of Humanity.”  The nature and definition of what it is to be human emerge in these symbols, i.e., reason as a sensorium of transcendence and the metaxy as the site of the “flow of presence” with its human and divine poles. Voegelin’s theoretical apparatus can shed light on the core development Hillesum underwent in the process of writing about her rich interior life. While Voegelin offered a systematic analysis of the Greek philosophers’ insights into humanity, Coetsier demonstrates the remarkable adequacy of Voegelin’s philosophy for interpreting Etty Hillesum’s writings.

In his review of Etty Hillesum and the Flow of Presence in Theological Studies, Prof. dr. Francis T. Hannafey (Religious Studies, Fairfield University) writes: Coetsier carefully studies the diaries and letters of Etty Hillesum, devoting special effort to a linguistic analysis of central Hillesum language symbols. Drawing extensively on the philosophy of Eric Voegelin—and particularly on his concept of "the flow of presence" (100) in the response of the human soul to the divine, C. seeks to better understand the “relationship between the life of Etty Hillesum and her writings” (193), proposing that Hillesum had an experience “that broke with the ordinary diary” (197, i.e., that pushed her beyond an ordinary form of diary writing), revealing a “symbolic form of transcendent address” (198). C. suggests that this interpretive insight can help us more fully understand Hillesum’s encounter with the “transcendent Other” (197), an encounter that eventually emerged at the center of her extraordinary life, suffering, and relationships.

C. actually offers carefully detailed analysis of both Hillesum and Voegelin. Hillesum’s writings and central Voegelinian ideas enter into creative dialogue, resulting in richer understandings of each. In places, however, the book progresses slowly, due mostly to its technical analysis and extensive quotations of Hillesum and Voegelin. This density may challenge some readers. Others might question the use of a comprehensive philosophical framework to examine diaries and letters that often break beyond linguistic analysis, at least in their spiritual and mystical dimensions.

These questions aside, C’s analysis is original, carefully researched, and highly creative. His study of the original Dutch texts is a particularly valuable contribution, placing the volume among the best English, book-length studies of Hillesum. In the end, C’s appeal to Voegelin's theory of “the flow of presence” succeeds in presenting more fully the depth and power of Hillesum’s astounding prayer-filled experience during a period of horrendous violence, evil, and suffering—a time, but also an experience, that must never be forgotten.

Synopsis
Etty Hillesum and the Flow of Presence: A Voegelinian Analysis is an account of the life, works and vision of two prominent mystical thinkers, Etty Hillesum and Eric Voegelin, whose lives were shaped by the totalitarian Nazi-regime. This book explores how mystical attunement to the flow of presence is the key to the development of Etty Hillesum's life and writings. Eric Voegelin's analysis of the history of order is focused on the responses of individuals and societies to the divine presence. Etty Hillesum's The Letters and Diaries illustrates her heroic struggle to come to terms with her personal life in the context of her gradual response to the flowing presence.

Etty Hillesum died at the age of twenty-nine in Auschwitz midway through World War II. All her energy had been absorbed in a daily search for the meaning of her life, for an understanding of her relationships with others, and for an insight into the ultimate purpose of each individual's contribution to the well being and maintenance of the human spirit.

Eric Voegelin's philosophical symbol "the flow of presence" ("the intersection of time with the timeless") is designed to “catch’’ changes and shifts in the mode of human responsiveness to the divine presence and it is especially helpful in clarifying what is taking place in the soul of Etty Hillesum. Her response to the flow of presence while she was undergoing significant breakthroughs in her spiritual life in the context of a period of overwhelming social disorder, amounts to a testament of great courage. It is an inspiration and an affirmation of the indestructible wonder of life. In one of his final conclusions Coetsier writes: “The complexity of the human condition will require the ability to be human in transcending our immediate and simply given context through an attunement to the flow of presence.” Etty Hillesum and Eric Voegelin have provided a welcome antidote to the restless and wandering spirit of a complex and turbulent era and this book guides the reader to the heart of their mystical thought.

With the current explosion of interest in inter-religious dialogue, peace studies, Judaism, the holocaust, gender studies and mysticism, it is an attempt to respond to the signs of the times. Accompanying the treatment of Voegelin's and Hillesum's writing, this book includes an extensive bibliography of international scholarship on both authors.

References

External links
 Etty Hillesum and the Flow of Presence (University of Missouri Press)

2008 non-fiction books